Somewhere Between is the debut studio album by the American country music singer-songwriter Suzy Bogguss, released on March 21, 1989 through Capitol Records. Preceded by the singles "I Want to Be a Cowboy's Sweetheart" and "Somewhere Between", the album reached number 41 on the Billboard Top Country Albums during its 37-week chart stay. The album's third single "Cross My Broken Heart" peaked at number 14 on the Billboard Hot Country Songs. Following the album's success, Bogguss was named the Academy of Country Music's Top New Female Vocalist.

The album is titled after Merle Haggard's song "Somewhere Between", initially released in 1967 on the album Branded Man. "Night Rider's Lament" was originally recorded by Jerry Jeff Walker on his 1975 album, Ridin' High.

Background and recording
The songs "Hopeless Romantic", "I Want to Be a Cowboy's Sweetheart" and "Somewhere Between" predate the LP by some years. "Hopeless Romantic" was a song written by Doug Crider, which Bogguss produced and recorded in her demo tape while working as singer at the Dollywood theme park. After Bogguss met Crider, the two eventually married in November 1986. When Wendy Waldman was advanced by Capitol Records as a possible producer, Bogguss found that it was "hard to be totally objective." Although Bogguss was impressed with several male producers who were considered, she decided on having Waldman as producer. Upon discovering a record of Patsy Montana's "I Want to Be a Cowboy's Sweetheart", Bogguss learned the song's yodel by working on it repeatedly until she eventually imitated it.

Promotional video
The only music video made to promote the album was the titular song, "Somewhere Between". Directed by Armanda Costanza and released in 1988, the video opens with a solo performance by Suzy Bogguss on her instrument at SyncroSound Studios (now known as 615 Music Studios), where the album was recorded. The performance fades to Bogguss leaving a car belonging to her boyfriend and walking alone dejectedly before returning to the solo performance. Next, it fades into Bogguss spending time in the park with her dog as well as her boyfriend, portrayed by Billy Dean, before returning again to the solo performance for the second chorus. During the instrumental break, Bogguss watches her boyfriend leave in his car before fading back to the performance again for the second verse. Bogguss and her boyfriend take photos of themselves in the park, followed by Bogguss singing by herself. The scene reverts to the solo performance once again for the finale. In the closing seconds of the video, the studio's engineer finishes recording and gives positive comments on her performance.

Track listing

LP edition

Personnel
Suzy Bogguss — vocals

Additional musicians
Eddie Bayers — drums
Craig Bickhardt — backing vocals
Jerry Douglas — dobro
Paul Franklin — pedal steel guitar, pedal dobro
Vince Gill —backing vocals
Rob Hajacos — fiddle (5)
Mac McAnally — backing vocals
Terry McMillan — percussion
Tony Migliore — accordion
Craig Nelson — bass
Mark O'Connor — mandolin, fiddle
Gary Prim — keyboards (9)
Matt Rollings — keyboards
Harry Stinson — backing vocals
Wendy Waldman — backing vocals

Recording personnel
Jeff Geidt — assistant engineer
Daniel Johnston — assistant engineer
Ken Love — mastering engineer
Eric Prestidge — mixer, mastering engineer
Dennis Ritchie — additional recording
Wendy Waldman — producer
John Wiles — recording engineer

Chart positions

Album

Singles

Release details

References

External links
 Amazon.com review
 Rate Your Music review

1989 debut albums
Suzy Bogguss albums
Capitol Records albums
Albums produced by Wendy Waldman